Oliver Heritage Magazine is a bi-monthly publication dedicated to the users, collectors, and enthusiasts of all tractors and equipment under the Oliver flag, including Oliver, White, Hart-Parr, and Cletrac. From James Oliver's first chilled plow to the White Field Boss, this full-color magazine presents technical articles, history, personal stories, and tractor and machinery reviews. Founded in 2004 and with subscribers worldwide, current circulation is 11,000. Oliver Heritage is a must-have publication for anyone interested in the history of the Oliver line of machinery. Current and founding editor is Sherry Schaefer, a renowned Oliver expert who has also written and contributed to several agricultural books and publications.

References

External links
 

2004 establishments in Illinois
Bimonthly magazines published in the United States
History magazines published in the United States
Magazines established in 2004
Magazines published in Illinois
Tractors
Oliver Farm Equipment Company